Harrison County is a county located in the U.S. state of Iowa. As of the 2020 census, the population was 14,582. The county seat is Logan. The county was formed in 1851. It was named for ninth US President William Henry Harrison.

Harrison County is included in the Omaha-Council Bluffs, NE-IA Metropolitan Statistical Area.

Geography

Major highways
 Interstate 29
 U.S. Highway 30
 Iowa Highway 37
 Iowa Highway 44
 Iowa Highway 127
 Iowa Highway 183
 Iowa Highway 191

Adjacent counties
Monona County  (north)
Crawford County  (northeast)
Shelby County  (east)
Pottawattamie County  (south)
Washington County, Nebraska  (southwest)
Burt County, Nebraska  (northwest)

National protected area
 DeSoto National Wildlife Refuge (part)

Demographics

2020 census
There were 6,665 housing units, of which 5,951 were occupied.

2010 census
There were 6,731 housing units, of which 5,987 were occupied.

2000 census
As of the census of 2000, there were 15,666 people, 6,115 households, and 4,304 families residing in the county. The population density was 22 people per square mile (9/km2). There were 6,602 housing units at an average density of 10 per square mile (4/km2). The racial makeup of the county was 98.69% White, 0.08% Black or African American, 0.22% Native American, 0.16% Asian, 0.01% Pacific Islander, 0.20% from other races, and 0.64% from two or more races. 0.72% of the population were Hispanic or Latino of any race.

There were 6,115 households, out of which 32.30% had children under the age of 18 living with them, 59.30% were married couples living together, 7.60% had a female householder with no husband present, and 29.60% were non-families. 26.10% of all households were made up of individuals, and 13.70% had someone living alone who was 65 years of age or older.  The average household size was 2.51 and the average family size was 3.02.

In the county, the population was spread out, with 26.20% under the age of 18, 6.80% from 18 to 24, 27.00% from 25 to 44, 22.30% from 45 to 64, and 17.70% who were 65 years of age or older. The median age was 39 years. For every 100 females there were 96.50 males. For every 100 females age 18 and over, there were 91.80 males.

The median income for a household in the county was $38,141, and the median income for a family was $44,586. Males had a median income of $30,000 versus $21,663 for females. The per capita income for the county was $17,662. About 5.00% of families and 7.10% of the population were below the poverty line, including 8.70% of those under age 18 and 8.70% of those age 65 or over.

Communities

Cities

Dunlap
Little Sioux
Logan
Magnolia
Missouri Valley
Modale
Mondamin
Persia
Pisgah
Woodbine

Unincorporated communities

Townships

 Allen
 Boyer
 Calhoun
 Cass
 Cincinnati
 Clay
 Douglas
 Harrison
 Jackson
 Jefferson
 La Grange
 Lincoln
 Little Sioux
 Magnolia
 Morgan
 Raglan
 St. Johns
 Taylor
 Union
 Washington

Census Designated Places and Unincorporated Towns 
California Junction
River Sioux
Orson
Yorkshire
Beebeetown

Population ranking
The population ranking of the following table is based on the 2020 census of Harrison County.

† county seat

Politics
Harrison County is strongly Republican in presidential elections. Only seven Democratic Party candidates have won the county from 1880 to the present, the most recent of whom was Lyndon B. Johnson in 1964.

See also

Harrison County Courthouse (Iowa)
National Register of Historic Places listings in Harrison County, Iowa
Old Harrison County Courthouse (Iowa)

References

External links

Harrison County website

 
1851 establishments in Iowa
Iowa counties on the Missouri River
Populated places established in 1851